Really Livin is an album recorded by the J. J. Johnson Sextet which was released on the Columbia label.

Reception

AllMusic awarded the album 3 stars.

Track listing
 "Me Too" (J. J. Johnson) - 6:00
 "Decision" (Sonny Rollins) - 4:50
 "I've Got It Bad and That Ain't Good" (Duke Ellington, Paul Francis Webster) - 4:10
 "Red Cross" (Charlie Parker) - 2:45
 "Almost Like Being in Love" (Frederick Loewe, Alan Jay Lerner) - 4:45
 "Stardust" (Hoagy Carmichael, Mitchell Parish) - 4:10
 "Sidewinder" (Johnson) - 7:05
 "God Bless the Child" (Billie Holiday, Arthur Herzog, Jr.) - 5:18
 "Speak Low" (Kurt Weill, Ogden Nash) - 6:27

Personnel
J. J. Johnson – trombone
Nat Adderley – cornet 
Bobby Jaspar – tenor saxophone, flute (tracks 1, 2 & 4-9)
Cedar Walton – piano
Spanky DeBrest – bass
Albert Heath – drums

References

Columbia Records albums
J. J. Johnson albums
1959 albums
Albums produced by Irving Townsend